Scottie Revette Cuevas (born November 26, 1965) is an American politician. He served as a Democratic member of the Mississippi State Senate from 1996 to 2008. He was defeated for reelection in 2007, losing to primary challenger David Baria by 36 votes. From January 2004 through December 2007, he served as chairman of the Senate Committee on Economic Development and Committee on Tourism.

In 2011, he sought the Republican nomination for Mississippi Transportation Commissioner from the Southern District, losing to Senator Tom King.

In 2020, he ran for Harrison County Tax Collector, ultimately placing in third behind Sharon Nash Barnett and Connie Rockco.

References

External links

Democratic Party Mississippi state senators
1965 births
Living people
20th-century American politicians
21st-century American politicians